Malayotyphlops is a genus of snakes in the family Typhlopidae.

Distribution
The 12 species of the genus Malayotyphlops are found in Indonesia and the Philippines.

Species
The following species are recognized as being valid.
Malayotyphlops andyi 
Malayotyphlops canlaonensis 
Malayotyphlops castanotus  
Malayotyphlops collaris 
Malayotyphlops denrorum 
Malayotyphlops hypogius 
Malayotyphlops koekkoeki 
Malayotyphlops kraalii 
Malayotyphlops luzonensis 
Malayotyphlops manilae 
Malayotyphlops ruber  
Malayotyphlops ruficauda 

Nota bene: A binomial authority in parentheses indicates that the species was originally described in a genus other than Malayotyphlops.

References

Further reading
Hedges SB, Marion AB, Lipp KM, Marin J, Vidal N (2014). "A taxonomic framework for typhlopid snakes from the Caribbean and other regions (Reptilia, Squamata)". Caribbean Herpetology 49: 1-61. (Malayotyphlops, new genus, pp. 43–44).

 
Snake genera